Bloss is a surname. Notable people with the surname include:

John M. Bloss (1839–1905), American teacher
Margaret Varner Bloss (born 1927), retired American athlete 
Nick van Bloss (born 1967), English classical pianist 
Phil Bloss (born 1953), English former footballer
Rainer Bloss (1946–2015), German electronic musician
Werner H. Bloss (1930–1995), German scientist in the field of photovoltaics
Will Bloss (1869–1921), American football coach

See also 
John Bloss (disambiguation), various people

German-language surnames
Surnames from nicknames